Miss Europe 1967 was the 30th edition of the Miss Europe pageant and the 19th edition under the Mondial Events Organization. It was held in Nice, France on June 3, 1967. Paquita Torres Pérez of Spain, was crowned Miss Europe 1967 by out going titleholder Maria Dornier of France.

Results

Placements

Contestants 

 - Brigitte Hejda
 - Mauricette Sironval
 - Margrethe "Gitte" Rhein-Knudsen
 - Jennifer Lynn Lewis
 - Ritva Helena Lehto†
 - Anne Vernier
 - Brigitte Boy
 - Toula Galani
 - Irene van Campenhout
 - Guðrún Pétursdóttir
 - Gemma McNabb
 - Daniela Giordano†
 - Marie-Josée Mathgen
 - Patricia Best
 - Gro Goksør
 - Paquita Torres Pérez
 - Annika Hemminge
 - Anita Niderost
 - Yelda Gürani Saner
 - Slavenka Veselinović

Notes

Debuts

Returns

References

External links 
 

Miss Europe
1967 beauty pageants
1967 in France